Cubanichthys is a small genus of pupfishes endemic to the Caribbean Islands of Cuba and Jamaica. The name of this genus is a compound of Cuba, where the genus was thought to be endemic until C. pengellyi was placed in the genus, and the Greek word for fish, ichthys.

Species
There are currently two recognized species in this genus:
 Cubanichthys cubensis (C. H. Eigenmann, 1903) (Cuban killifish)
 Cubanichthys pengelleyi (Fowler, 1939) (Jamaican killifish)

References

 
Cyprinodontidae
Freshwater fish genera
Taxa named by Carl Leavitt Hubbs